Montpelier is an unincorporated community in Adair County, Kentucky, United States.  Its elevation is 876 feet (267 m).

References

Unincorporated communities in Adair County, Kentucky
Unincorporated communities in Kentucky